The Constitution of the Kingdom of Laos was the supreme law of the state. A written constitution, the text which took effect on 11 May 1947 had been formulated and enacted by the Constituent Assembly of the Kingdom of Laos, an elected popular body. The text of the Constitution was one of the legally binding sources of constitutional law in the Kingdom. The Constitution defined Laos as "a unitary, indivisible and democratic kingdom". It defined the Lao language the language of the state and made Buddhism the state religion.

The Constitution was composed of seven sections and 44 articles. It specified the role of the King of Laos, the Council of Ministers (the government) and the role of the National Assembly.

The Constitution was amended twice; first on 29 September 1956 and again on 30 July 1961.

The Constitution remained in force until 2 December 1975 when the Lao People's Revolutionary Party seized power and abolished the state that was the Kingdom of Laos.

References

Specific

Bibliography
Books:
 

1947 documents
1947 in law
1947 in Laos
Laos, Kingdom
Kingdom